Captain N: The Game Master is an animated television series that aired on television from 1989 to 1991 as part of the Saturday morning cartoon lineup on NBC. The show was produced by DIC Animation City and incorporated elements from many of the most popular video games of the time from the Japanese company Nintendo. There was also a comic book version by Valiant Comics, despite only featuring characters from games produced by Nintendo. The show is also part of an hour-long block in Season 2 with The Adventures of Super Mario Bros. 3 and with Super Mario World in Season 3 in a half-hour block.

Origins
The character Captain N first appeared in Nintendo Power magazine, created by Nintendo staff member and magazine editor Randy Studdard. The original concept involved Captain N (originally known as "Captain Nintendo") as a Nintendo employee and the Mother Brain as a piece of programming from a Nintendo game pak that went rogue. Captain N had the power to temporarily give life to characters and items from Nintendo games.

The story left a door open for a sequel (Mother Brain is temporarily defeated but her return was said to be inevitable, and Captain N vows to stop her when the time comes). Nintendo of America, Inc. later decided to follow Studdard's ideas and create a cartoon series, opting neither to credit nor to compensate its creator. DIC Entertainment was shopped as the animation studio, and changed various aspects of the original idea while keeping the main premise of the Captain opposing Mother Brain as he interacted with a number of video game characters.

Captain Nintendo also appeared in a prerecorded Nintendo Universe tip line series by Nintendo that was updated weekly. Captain Nintendo was joined by a computer companion named Emerald to offer tips on popular Nintendo Game Paks, as well as upcoming game announcements.

Premise
At the outset of the first episode the hero of the series, Kevin Keene, a teenager from Northridge, Los Angeles, California, and his dog Duke are taken to another universe known as Videoland when they are sucked into a vortex called the Ultimate Warp Zone that formed in his television.

To fulfill an ancient prophecy, Kevin is destined to become the hero "Captain N: The Game Master" and save Videoland from evil forces led by Mother Brain from the floating world/fortress called Metroid. By the time Kevin arrives on the scene, Mother Brain has almost succeeded in capturing the Palace of Power and conquering all Videoland. Kevin (who in Videoland is armed with a Zapper and a belt buckle shaped like an NES controller) and Duke appear suddenly on the other side of the Ultimate Warp Zone before the N Team, which consists of Princess Lana (the acting ruler of Videoland as the first episode explains the absence of her father the King), Simon Belmont, Mega Man, and Kid Icarus, none of whom show any confidence in Kevin's ability in the beginning. However, after Lana is kidnapped by the enemy shortly after Kevin's arrival, the reluctant group puts their differences aside to go on a rescue mission where Kevin eventually gains the others' confidence. During season 2, Game Boy (a human-sized supercomputer shaped like the console) joins the N Team.

In most episodes, the N Team's enemy is a group of video game villains, usually led by the boisterous and loud Mother Brain who is accompanied by her minions, the Eggplant Wizard, the thuggish King Hippo, and the scheming Dr. Wily. A "villain of the week" is featured in some episodes when a particular video game becomes the setting (such as Malkil of Wizards & Warriors). Several other characters make recurring appearances, including Donkey Kong, The Count from Castlevania and Dr. Light from Mega Man. The cast of the Legend of Zelda cartoon reprise their respective roles for several guest appearances during the series.

The focus of the show is mostly action-adventure sourced from the video games they feature, with comic relief in the form of the character's interactions with one another and the environment and their quirks and catchphrases. Sometimes humor (intentionally, or unintentionally) also stems from the comparatively loose interpretations of the laws of reality that apply in Videoland.

Characters

The N Team
 Kevin Keene (portrayed by Dorian Barag in the live-action sequences, voiced by Matt Hill in animated sequences) – The teenage leader, protagonist and main character of the series. Initially, he is a reluctant hero and is often found at odds with the rest of the N-Team. When he comes to Videoland, he is armed with a belt and holster that has a Power Pad (an NES controller-shaped device which can stop time, allow him to leap over objects or give him super speed over short distances) and an NES Zapper-like gun which dispatches or "dematerializes" enemies (possibly a nod to Nintendo's content policies at the time which forbid the use of the word "kill"). The Zapper can also shoot ice shaped like Tetris blocks. His expert use of these tools combined with his overall friendly, if competitive, demeanor eventually earns the trust of the others. In many episodes, he tries to foster a big-brotherly role to characters suffering from a particular plight. He is most often called Captain N by the other cast members, except Princess Lana who regularly addresses him by his first name. The Varsity letter "N" on his jacket is for swimming.
 Princess Lana (voiced by Venus Terzo) – The current regent of Videoland after her father, King Charles, was banished to the Mirror by Mother Brain. She rules over all the lands in Videoland from the Palace of Power. Though she reflects a kind character typified by a princess role, she is able to keep up with the rest of the N-team through their adventures and is not afraid of conflict, having been trained to defend herself from a young age. Though she is good friends with the members of the N-Team, Lana shows a longing for her own family. She often acts as a mediator between the members of the N-team when their competitive natures lead them to infighting. Both Kevin and Simon compete for Lana's affections, but she seems to prefer Kevin over Simon and kisses him on several occasions (including the last episode). Her appearance and dress consists of boots, a two-piece dress and top, a tiara, and a necklace with three green gems. Production art showed her holding a large staff.
 Duke (voiced by Tomm Wright) – Kevin's dog who jumped into the Ultimate Warp Zone immediately after Kevin was sucked in and ended up in Videoland as well. Although he acts intelligently, he shows occasional uncontrollable typical dog behavior, like the chase reflex. Duke is usually with Kevin through all the action in a given episode and sometimes sees his own action. Duke wears a bandanna around his neck. In the live-action scenes shown in the first two episodes as well as the intro, Duke is shown to be a Golden Retriever while he appears to be a beagle in the actual cartoon.
 Simon Belmont from Castlevania (voiced by Andrew Kavadas) – Until Captain N's arrival, vampire hunter Simon Belmont from Castlevania regarded himself as Princess Lana's highest-ranking servant. He displays extreme arrogance and vanity, often prefacing declarations of his character or capabilities by referring to himself in the 3rd person. He enjoys courting and complimenting Princess Lana, openly declaring his romantic interest in her (which she rebuffs but sometimes is flattered), but he enjoys tending to his appearance and physique even more. On one occasion when he was forced to face his worst fears in a dream world, it turned out his worst fear was a humorous form of body horror as his muscles sagged away, his teeth fell out and he lost all his hair. In his own distorted way, however, he does show regard for other members of the N-team, even if it outwardly seems back-handed. He is very competitive and he regards Captain N as a major rival for Princess Lana's attention. He wears a blue fabric outfit, pilot goggles, boots and large gloves, and carries around a backpack with a seemingly endless capacity of miscellaneous things he takes out and uses. He brandishes a whip, which occasionally has a mind of its own, but like Captain N's zapper, it can also dematerialize foes. Simon Belmont's look was at least partially based upon his voice actor Andrew Kavadas looking less like his appearance in the Castlevania game series.
 Kid Icarus from Kid Icarus (voiced by Alessandro Juliani) – The diminutive angel Kid Icarus from Mount Icarus is very loyal to, and protective of, Princess Lana and while he shows childish behavior, he is not short on courage. He is not very physically effective in action situations and often bemoans his small stature, but is the only N Team member who can fly, and usually is a very accurate archer. His quiver holds regular arrows which can dematerialize foes, but also has various specialized gadget arrows. He often ends many words in his speech with the suffix "-icus". He comes from the world of Mount Icarus. His appearance in Season 3 resembles his sprite and box art from Kid Icarus: Of Myths and Monsters for Game Boy.
 Mega Man from Mega Man (voiced by Doug Parker) – Almost as diminutive as Kid Icarus, Mega Man is a robot constructed by Dr. Light who is from the world of Megaland. He too is protective of Princess Lana. Despite his size, he is incredibly strong, physically durable, and extremely agile. His body is clad in multi-tone green armor and he wears a visor. He has two forearm-mounted energy blasters that function like Captain N's zapper. He occasionally begins his words with the prefix "mega-". His home world, along with Dr. Light, is Megaland. In the episode "Happy Birthday Mega Man" he is upset with the fact he is a nonliving robot and is transformed from a robot into a living man, although later in the series he is still shown to possess his robotic abilities.
 Game Boy (voiced by Frank Welker) – Debuting in the first episode of the second season ("Gameboy", aired September 8, 1990), Game Boy is a human-sized supercomputer designed like the Nintendo product of the same name, an 8-bit handheld video game device developed and manufactured by Nintendo. When the portal to Mirror World opened, King Charles sent him in his place to help Captain N. He announces himself as being "programmed to play games" but, when action arises, he is usually capable of meeting the challenge. His body exhibits elasticity when he stretches out his arms and hands from his casing. Game Boy also uses his display to materialize many things, including objects and monsters, mainly for the team's target practice. He also has an onboard computer which can analyze substances and track enemies.

Main villains
 Mother Brain from Metroid (voiced by Levi Stubbs) – The primary villain of the series. Mother Brain is a trash-talking, abusive, power-hungry brain-looking alien in a giant bottle who comes from the world of Metroid. In the pilot episode, her troops are marching at the door of the Palace of Power, and she had already captured and banished King Charles (the King of Videoland) to the Mirror World on Excalibur. Though proud of her form and presence, she is not above any subterfuge if it gets her goal accomplished. She also displays great vanity—almost as much as Simon Belmont. She spends most of her time stationary in a control room on her floating world, Metroid, where she uses a special "mirror" to spy on the members of the N Team as she looks for weaknesses to exploit. She also has retractable prehensile tentacles she uses to lash or electrically shock her usually incompetent minions to encourage them to do better.
 King Hippo from Punch-Out!! (voiced by Garry Chalk) – The monstrous, pear-shaped beast King Hippo is the "heavyweight" who is short on brains and big on muscle and comes from the world of Punch-Out, which is inspired by the game of the same name. He is cruel, indulgent, and sharp-tongued, but most of his ire is usually directed to his counterpart the Eggplant Wizard.
 Eggplant Wizard from Kid Icarus (voiced by Michael Donovan) – A one-eyed human-sized eggplant from Mount Icarus. Eggplant Wizard is a main foe of Kid Icarus, but mostly serves as a target of abuse for Mother Brain due to his incompetence. He is also the chief foil for King Hippo as the two usually appear at the same time. Eggplant Wizard also has the ability to conjure various vegetable-themed gadgets to aid in mischief. Unlike King Hippo, Eggplant Wizard has shown some signs of taking the initiative to come up with his own schemes and is not above turning against Mother Brain on rare occasions.
 Doctor Wily from Mega Man (voiced by Ian James Corlett) – The least shown of the main villains. Dr. Wily is a short, beady-eyed, and slightly grizzled old dwarf man from Megaland who is loyal to Mother Brain and arguably the most competent of her main henchmen. He is a stereotypical mad scientist who uses his genius to build wild gadgets or develop complicated schemes to defeat the N-Team. One notable episode had him using a mind-reading device to find out the greatest fears of the team members, then constructing a robot in the likeness of a school bully (Kevin's greatest fear). He speaks with a German accent and is constantly wheezing in his speech. Like the video games, Doctor Wily has used his Robot Masters on occasion.

Minor villains
 Donkey Kong from Donkey Kong (voiced by Garry Chalk) – A gigantic gorilla from Kongoland. Mostly a solitary character, Donkey Kong is quick to anger and not happy to see visitors in what he considers his jungle. Donkey Kong must be appeased with food from the inhabitants or else he will wreak havoc on them. Donkey Kong has no loyalties and is equally dangerous to all the characters with the exception of the Videolympics episode where he joins Mother Brain's team.
 The Count from Castlevania (voiced by Garry Chalk) – A pasty, lanky vampire in a gauche yellow suit, he is the representation of Dracula from Castlevania, but is never referred to directly as Dracula. He demonstrates the ability to control the undead and transform into a bat in order to threaten the countryside of Castlevania, but rarely teams up with any other character for his goals (with the exception of the Videolympics episode where he joins Mother Brain's team). In his Season 3 appearance (the only one of this season), he wears a more appropriate black and dark blue suit.
 Alucard (voiced by Ian James Corlett) – The son of the Count who lives in Castlevania. He is depicted as an adolescent with typical teenage hobbies such as skateboarding and a rebellious attitude towards his father.
 Dragonlord from Dragon Warrior (voiced by Don Brown) – A huge red dragon of near-Donkey Kong size, the Dragonlord makes multiple attempts to rule Dragon's Den, the world of Dragon Warrior. Intelligent, if somewhat gullible, he uses both his size and his magical powers to further his goal of conquering his world and ruling over all its citizens.
 Ganon from The Legend of Zelda (voiced by Len Carlson) – A pig-like wizard, who serves as Link and Zelda's greatest enemy who has attacked Hyrule on occasion. He is a powerful warlock who wields strong magic, but Link has always previously overcome him. After Link had defeated him recently, he lost most of his power, before drinking the potion of power provided to him by King Hippo and Eggplant Wizard, regaining all his strength and power.
 Rebonack from Zelda II: The Adventure of Link – A silver armored knight who serves Ganon. He rides a floating mechanical horse and wields a lance in battle.
 Malkil from Wizards & Warriors (voiced by Garry Chalk) – An evil wizard from the world of Excalibur who is also a gnome. He also appears as one of the primary villains from the sister show The Power Team.
 Medusa from Kid Icarus (voiced by Venus Terzo) – A female gorgon who is the Goddess of Darkness from Mount Icarus. She can turn anyone or anything to stone by using her gaze.

Other characters
The following characters appear in at least 2 episodes:
 King Charles Oberonn (voiced by Long John Baldry) – The original monarch of Videoland, and father of both Lana and Lyle, was captured by Mother Brain and banished to the Mirror World before the start of the show and has remained trapped there since. He is a kind and compassionate ruler who places his judgement of others above his own well-being. He has an impressive white beard and moustache, and wears ornate multicolor clothing.
 Princess Zelda from The Legend of Zelda (voiced by Cynthia Preston) – A beautiful young woman, she rules Hyrule and protects the Triforces (here, she has all three) from evil as well as providing help to the N Team. She is a close friend to Princess Lana since before Mother Brain waged war on Videoland, and the two regard each other highly. She wields a bow occasionally to deal with foes.
 Link from The Legend of Zelda (voiced by Jonathan Potts) – A young warrior who serves Zelda, Link is a heroic figure who is brave, friendly (if somewhat competitive), and resourceful. He also fights to defend the Triforce and Hyrule from enemies and wields a double-edged sword. He is Kevin's idol and favorite video game character. There was minor friction between them when Zelda complimented Kevin on his skills and intelligence, causing some jealously and mild resentment on Link's part. However this was later defused when he and Kevin worked together to defeat Ganon and they became close friends. Unlike his appearance in the Legend of Zelda cartoon, Link is older and portrayed as being more mature and no longer obsessed with trying to steal a kiss from Zelda. She repeatedly kisses him voluntarily.
 Prince Lyle – Brother to Princess Lana, Lyle left home at an undisclosed time after feeling out of place. Despite his lineage, he displays few leadership skills or heroism, and generally regards himself as clumsy in spite of his good intentions. Thinking it for the best, he left home and took up residence on the world of Tetris where he guards the Sacred Square. Lana and the other team members convince him that nobody will have any confidence in him as a leader until after he believes in himself.
 Wombatman – A parody of Batman, Wombatman is a squat and cynical actor who portrays his character of the same name which is filmed on the Marblopolis Studio World. Kid Icarus idolizes him and identifies with the various gadgets he uses, as he comes up with similar gadget arrows in his quiver. Kid Icarus was later distraught when he found out that Wombatman doesn't do his own stunts. When his girlfriend Nikki was held prisoner, Wombatman reluctantly helped Mother Brain capture the N Team. He later helped the N Team at Kid Icarus' persuasion and started doing his own stunts.
 Mayor Squaresly (voiced by Garry Chalk) – The mayor of Tetris. He is most fond of holidays and declares a new one when he gets the chance. He also escapes a villain, who is turning Tetris' citizens into Tetris blocks, to contact the N-Team for help.
 Bayou Billy from The Adventures of Bayou Billy (voiced by Garry Chalk) – Bayou Billy is the main character from the video game that Kevin could not beat. He has an alligator named Loafer for a pet and rides around Bayouland in a buggy-like vehicle. Bayou Billy helps Captain N find his lost dog by training him in the ways of bayou tracking. The tricks that Kevin learns from Bayou Billy come in handy when facing Doctor Wily's swamp creature.
 Prince Plenty – The monarch that reigns over Kongoland, except when Donkey Kong is involved. Prince Plenty is blue-skinned like all the humanoid inhabitants of Kongoland. He is a very soft-spoken and friendly ruler who manages to keep tranquility in Kongoland, even with Donkey Kong on the loose as he has invented a machine that feeds Donkey Kong fruit and keeps him away from the city.
 Doctor Light (voiced by Antony Holland) – The genius scientist from Megaland who built Mega Man and Mega Girl, he teams up with the N Team to fight off Dr. Wily and Mother Brain. He also serves as a father figure to Mega Man. He is the Captain N incarnation of Doctor Light.
 Mega Girl (voiced by Lelani Marrell) – A girl robot with very similar construction to Mega Man, except her armor is pink and white. She wants to be friends with him very much, but is turned away initially as she reminds him that he is not human. She is the Captain N incarnation of Roll.

Episodes

Featured video games
Because Captain N: The Game Master took place in a world where video games existed as reality, a multitude of video games were used in the thirty-four episodes of the series. In some cases only areas and elements from the game were used, but the protagonist was absent (some examples include Wizards & Warriors, Dragon Warrior, and Metroid). The following video games were portrayed at least once during the series' run with the ones that appeared having their own world in Videoland:
 The Adventures of Bayou Billy – The setting of Bayouland.
 Bo Jackson Baseball – The setting of Baseball World.
 BurgerTime – The setting of Burger Time. The N Team is revealed to have a Warp Zone to this world in the Palace of Power's kitchen as seen in "Gameboy."
 California Games – This is the setting of the self-titled beach-themed world. In "The Big Game", Kevin Keene reunites with his high school friends where they compete against Dr. Wily's Robot Masters from Mega Man 2. In "A Tale of Two Dogs", Kevin and Mega Man kill time here while waiting for Dr. Light and Dr. Wily to complete their peace-keeping robot.
 Castlevania
 Castlevania II: Simon's Quest – Music from this game was used.
 Castlevania III: Dracula's Curse
 Donkey Kong – The setting of Kongoland. Music from this game was used.
 Donkey Kong Jr. – In "Simon the Ape-Man", Simon Belmont thought he was Donkey Kong Junior when he had amnesia. Music from this game was used.
 Dragon Warrior (now referred to as Dragon Quest) – The setting of Dragon's Den.
 Faxanadu – The setting of the self-titled world and is home to a race of dwarves and elves.
 Final Fantasy – The setting of the self-titled world.
 Jordan vs. Bird: One on One – The setting of Hoopworld.
 Kid Icarus – The setting for Mount Icarus. Music from this game is used.
 Marble Madness  – In the episode "I Wish I Was a Wombatman", the studio world of Marblopolis is structurally inspired by Marble Madness, right down to a giant black marble weapon with which Mother Brain attacks the N Team. Also in the earlier episode "The Trojan Dragon", the theme from the first level of Marble Madness can be heard several times.
 Mega Man – The setting of Megaland. Music from this game is used and the original Robot Masters appear in "Mega Trouble for Megaland".
 Mega Man 2 – The Robot Masters from this game are featured.
 Mega Man 3 – The Robot Masters from this game, Doc Robot, and Gamma are featured.
 Metroid – The setting of the self-titled world. Music from this game is also used.
 Nemesis – Music from this game is mostly used in Season 2. "The Trojan Dragon", for example, features this game's Stage 2 theme "Fortress" during the first minute of the episode. This same music was also used in the Japan-only Famicom game Gradius II.
 Mike Tyson's Punch-Out!! – Te setting of Punch-Out. Music from this game is used.
 Paperboy – The setting of News World where the Daily Sun newspaper is published.
 Puss 'n Boots: Pero's Great Adventure – The setting of Puss 'n Boots and is inhabited by anthropomorphic animals.
 Robin Hood: Prince of Thieves – The setting of Nottingham.
 Solar Striker – Music from this game is used. The episode "Germ Wars", among others, used the Stage 1/2 theme from this game.
 Super Mario Bros. – In the first episode, Kevin briefly compares the Ultimate Warp Zone to this game. Many of the sound effects came from this game, such as jumping. The music for both the underground and fortress stages also is featured. Also, background music and featured songs were shared with The Super Mario Bros. Super Show!.
 Super Mario Bros. 2 – Music from this game is used.
 Tetris – The setting of its self-titled world. Music from this game is used.
 Wizards & Warriors – The setting of Excalibur where it is filled with giant spiders, werewolves, and other known foes. In "Nightmare on Mother Brain's Street", the N Team traveled to the world of Wizards & Warriors and battled the resident villain the wizard Malkil who also appeared on a few times on The Power Team opposite his enemy the knight Kuros.
 The Legend of Zelda – The setting of Hyrule.
 Zelda II: The Adventure of Link – Rebonack appears from this game.

Although nearly every major Nintendo franchise at the time was represented at some point or another in the show, the Super Mario games were noticeably absent, although a line mentioning the game is included in the pilot episode comparing the Ultimate Warp Zone that brings Captain N to Videoland to the warp zones in Super Mario Bros. This is because The Super Mario Bros. Super Show was airing around the same time which featured the characters and world of the Mario games.

Cast
 Garry Chalk – King Hippo, Donkey Kong, Count Dracula, Rush, Bayou Billy, Malkil, Mayor Squaresly, Additional Voices
 Ian James Corlett – Dr. Wily, Alucard, Pero, Mega Man (Season 3 only)
 Michael Donovan – Eggplant Wizard, additional voices
 Matt Hill – Kevin Keene/Captain N
 Doc Harris – Narrator
 Alessandro Juliani – Kid Icarus
 Andrew Kavadas – Simon Belmont
 Doug Parker – Mega Man
 Levi Stubbs – Mother Brain (Credited as "Levi Stubbs, Jr.")
 Venus Terzo – Princess Lana, Medusa, Kevin's Mom (voice-over only)
 Tomm Wright – Duke
 Frank Welker – Game Boy (Season 2 only)

Additional voices

 Suzanne E. Balcom
 Long John Baldry – King Charles, Little John, Clock-Man, Poltergeist King
 Don Brown – Dragonlord
 Len Carlson – Ganon
 Babz Chula
 Violet Crumble
 Christopher Gaze
 Tony Dakota
 Angela Gann
 Marcy Goldberg
 Antony Holland – Doctor Light
 Lee Jeffrey
 Alex Jordan
 Annabelle Kershaw
 Campbell Lane
 Blu Mankuma
 Lelani Marrell – Mega Girl
 Scott McNeil – Proto Man, Dr Wily (Season 3)
 Colin Meachum
 Shane Meier – Julio
 Andrew Narados
 Pauline Newstone
 Jonathan Potts – Link
 Cynthia Preston – Princess Zelda
 Alvin Sanders
 Marlow Vella
 Mark Weatherly
 Kurt Weldon

Crew
Writers:
 Jeffrey Scott (13 episodes)
 Dennis O'Flaherty (4 episodes)
 Matt Uitz (4 episodes)
 Michael Maurer (4 episodes)
 Dorothy Middleton (3 episodes)
 David Ehrman (2 episodes)
 Sean Roche (2 episodes)
 Calvin Kelley (1 episode)
 Greg Klein (1 episode)
 Paul Dell (1 episode)
 Rick Merwin (1 episode)
 Steven Weiss (1 episode)
 Ted Alben (1 episode)

Madeleine Bascom – Recording Director (season 3)
Marsha Goodman – Recording Director (season 1)
Greg Morton – Recording Director (seasons 1–2)
Doug Parker – Talent Coordinator
Stu Rosen – Recording Director (season 1), Casting (season 2)
Alvin Sanders – Recording Assistant (season 2)

Comic series
The Captain N comic book was published by Valiant Comics as part of the Nintendo Comics System in 1990. Despite being based on the television cartoon of the same name, it was actually quite different from the show. The comics had a more serious tone than the cartoon. Additionally, all third-party characters (Simon Belmont, Mega Man, Dr. Light, the Count, and Dr. Wily) were not in the comic. Samus Aran, who never appeared in the cartoon, was a recurring character who falls in love with Kevin, and becomes Lana's rival for his affections. When asked by a fan why Samus did not appear in the television series, Jeffrey Scott said that he never heard about her. An article at 1UP.COM describes Samus as "rambunctious, reckless, and gets into @#!*% contests with Lana over Kevin's affections, which makes for some of the most entertaining situations in the series". The reviewer added: "Not to say that the deadly quiet, contemplative Samus who fights for truth and justice in the more recent Metroid games isn't awesome, but there's something compelling about a Samus who's greedy and conniving – and is proud to admit it."

Mother Brain's second-in-command became Uranos, the God of the Sky based on a regular enemy from Kid Icarus. Pit's toga was changed from white to yellow and, in most of the stories, Lana's dress was purple. However, in the comics Lana has a weapon – a scepter she had in concept art, but only had a very brief appearance on one episode of the show.

In the last printed issue of the comic book, a letter column promised that Mega Man would make an appearance but the comic was aborted abruptly and this never came into existence. The first issue was to be included as a digital reprint on the DVD set, but could not since the rights to the comic are in limbo.

In other languages
 Italian: Un videogioco per Kevin

Syndication and changes

Captain N and the Video Game Masters
Captain N entered broadcast syndication, and aired on local stations from 1992 to 1993 by Rysher Entertainment, Captain N & The Video Game Masters, a 65-episode package which included Captain N, The Legend of Zelda, The Adventures of Super Mario Bros. 3, and Super Mario World.
 Video Game Masters had its own theme song, followed by a commercial break, followed by the theme song of whichever series was being shown on that day. The lyrics consisted of "The world of Captain N is here" sung four times.
 Like The Super Mario Bros. Super Show, action/chase scenes in the first-season episodes were set to studio covers of pop music, such as Bob Seger's "Shakedown" in "Kevin in Videoland" and "Danger Zone" by Kenny Loggins in "Mega Trouble for Megaland". Due to copyright issues, these songs were removed in all later reruns and releases, and replaced by an instrumental glam-rock song from Season 2's "The Feud of Faxanadu".
 The Zelda episodes were cut for time when aired in the Video Game Masters package and two episodes were shown in each half-hour block.
 Many episodes also received minor changes when they were released in syndication as part of the Captain N & The Video Game Masters package. All episodes were time compressed and split into two acts instead of three to fit in the time slot for more commercials. All episodes except "The Feud of Faxanadu" used the second season intro and credits. Season 3 episodes also cut out the opening title card for each episode.

Other airings

Family Channel
Family Channel played only the first 26 episodes from fall 1991 to summer 1992, while season 3 aired on NBC. Episodes were slightly time compressed to fit in more commercials, making episodes around 2 minutes shorter. Episodes were split into 4 acts instead of 2 or 3, adding an extra commercial fade. Family Channel airings also included the featured songs that played on the NBC and YTV airings, unlike later airings on WGN, Fox, and USA Network.

USA Network
Starting in the fall of 1993, USA Network briefly began showing reruns of the series on their Sunday lineup of their USA Cartoon Express animation block. Unlike other reruns, USA opted to edit scenes out of various episodes to cut the length down to their required limit in order to fit in more commercials. In 1994, it was taken off in most channels, and this was the last time the series has been shown on US TV.

Alternative versions of episodes
 "How's Bayou": The original version of this episode that aired on September 16, 1989, differed from the version that aired on all later airings. This version featured some dialogue changes/rearrangements/etc., an alternative piece of instrumental music in the Kevin/Lana dancing scene, and several other small changes here and there. Additionally, in the original airing, several shots were missing their backgrounds. The Shout Factory DVD release contains this episode in its unfinished form (albeit with the cover of "Born on the Bayou" replaced with the generic "Mega Move" instrumental and the teaser shown before the intro). When it was first rerun in December 1989 (and on all subsequent reruns), the episode was shown in its finished form, but this finished version has yet to be officially released. The second version circulates online, sourced from videotapes made by viewers in the late '80s and early '90s.
 "When Mother Brain Rules": This "clip show" episode has at least two different versions. There are many scenes with dialog but no music, and vice versa. In the second version, many of these sequences are changed around, and more color commentary (particularly by Simon Belmont) is added.
 Some of the Season 1 and season 2 episodes ("Nightmare on Mother Brain Street", "Quest for the Potion of Power", "Invasion of the Paper Pedalers", "Three Men and a Dragon", & "Mr. and Mrs. Mother Brain") were recut to 10 minutes long for airing in season 3 as filler. In addition to being edited, the soundtrack was also re-scored (possibly to accommodate for the edits). Unlike the other four episodes, "Quest for the Potion of Power" was merely split into two parts and had new narration added in, as well as having the music redone.

VHS releases
In the early 1990s, three season 2 Captain N episodes were released on VHS tapes distributed by Buena Vista Home Video in the US. ("Gameboy", "Quest for the Potion of Power", and "The Trouble with Tetris"). Each tape contained one episode.

DVD releases and changes
Captain N was released in Region 1 on February 27, 2007, by Shout! Factory and Sony BMG Music Entertainment. However, although the set is called The Complete Series, there are some omissions:
 Season 3 was considered to be part of a different series, due to sharing a half-hour block with the Super Mario World cartoon on NBC in the fall of 1991; copyright holders required that the Captain N and Super Mario World episodes be released together. Captain N & The New Super Mario World has since been released on DVD in a separate two-disc set, as originally broadcast in 1991.
 Episode 27, "When Mother Brain Rules", which was a clip show episode, was not included on the master tapes that DiC sent to Shout! Factory, so this episode is not included on the DVD set.
 The unfinished original version of "How's Bayou" is included in this set, rather than the revised version seen in reruns.
 Shout! Factory received tapes containing Family Channel airings for season 2 episodes (the episodes were cut for time and split into 4 acts instead of 3). Seasons 1 and 3 use their original masters.
 The opening "teasers" are not included on the DVD set, as these were not a part of Shout! Factory's deal with DiC. The only teaser on the disc is the one for "Kevin in Videoland", featured as a bonus feature on disc one. Some teasers for "Captain N & Super Mario World" are included on the menus of the "Captain N & Super Mario World" DVD.
 A two-minute-long scene from the episode "Queen of the Apes" is absent from the earliest DVD releases, making the episode run two minutes shorter than the others. Missing from the DVD is the entire "underwater piranha battle" scene involving Kevin and Simon, and some of the "hoisting Mother Brain's body up a cliff" scene with Kid Icarus and Mega Man. Brian Ward of Shout! Factory has stated that this was an authoring error, and a replacement disc program was initiated.
 Covers of pop songs used in the original broadcasts are replaced with an instrumental version of the "Mega Move" song from "The Feud of Faxanadu" due to concerns over the songs' broadcast rights. The songs in Season 2 were performed exclusively for the series and were not removed.

The DVD set is packaged in two double-disc thin packs. The booklet planned for the set was omitted due to time constraints, as no further delays were wanted.

A single-disc release titled "Adventures in Videoland", containing 4 episodes, was released by NCircle Entertainment on July 22, 2008.

Regional DVD releases
Every episode of Season 3 is available on Australian DVD alongside the entire series of the "Super Mario World" cartoon, just like in the US.

Three of the episodes of Season 3 are available on a Japanese DVD.

Music
 Haim Saban and Shuki Levy composed all the background music for the first season, while Michael Tavera took over for Season 2 and 3's background score. Tavera also provided orchestrations and arrangements for the music in Season 1.
 The original NBC airing of "When Mother Brain Rules" in terms of music differed slightly from the syndication version that aired on the video game masters package; the NBC version kept all of Shuki Levy's score in all of the season 1 footage clips, but the syndication version replaced those with Michael Tavera's Season 2 score in the Season 1 clips.
 Brief in-studio covers of contemporary pop music were used in chase scenes of the first season. These were removed after the show went into syndication, due to copyright issues. Original songs, loosely based on existing music, were used in action sequences in seasons 2 and 3.

Film
Actor and writer Noel Clarke revealed to Digital Spy in an interview that he was interested in developing a live action film adaptation of the series.

See also
 The Legend of Zelda (TV series)
 The Power Team (TV series)
 The Super Mario Bros. Super Show!

References

External links

Informational sites
 The Unofficial Captain N Home Page
 CaptainN.Net

1980s American animated television series
1990s American animated television series
1980s American comic science fiction television series
1990s American comic science fiction television series
1989 American television series debuts
1991 American television series endings
American children's animated action television series
American children's animated adventure television series
American children's animated comic science fiction television series
American children's animated science fantasy television series
American television series with live action and animation
Animated series based on video games
Crossover animated television series
Television series by DIC Entertainment
NBC original programming
English-language television shows
Nintendo franchises
Television series based on Nintendo video games
Television shows set in California
Television shows filmed in Vancouver